Valery Ilyich Rozhdestvensky (Russian: Валерий Ильич Рождественский; 13 February 1939 – 31 August 2011) was a Soviet cosmonaut.

Rozhdestvensky was born in Leningrad and graduated from the Higher Military Engineering School of Soviet Navy in Pushkin in engineering. From 1961 to 1965 he was commander of a deepsea diving unit in the Baltic Sea War Fleet.

Rozhdestvensky was selected as a cosmonaut on 23 October 1965 and flew as Flight Engineer on Soyuz 23. After his space flight he continued to work with the space program at the Yuri Gagarin Cosmonaut Training Center. He retired on 24 June 1986 and worked with Metropolis Industries. He was married with one child. He died on 31 August 2011 at the age of 72.

Awards 
 Hero of the Soviet Union
 Pilot-Cosmonaut of the USSR
 Order of Lenin
 Order for Service to the Homeland in the Armed Forces of the USSR 3rd class
 Medal "For Merit in Space Exploration"

References 

1939 births
2011 deaths
Heroes of the Soviet Union
Engineers from Saint Petersburg
Soviet cosmonauts
Soviet engineers
Recipients of the Order of Lenin
Recipients of the Medal "For Merit in Space Exploration"
Soviet Navy personnel